Richard Chinapoo (born January 18, 1957) was a Trinidad soccer defender who had an extensive career, primarily in the United States.  Chinapoo spent two seasons in the North American Soccer League, eight in the National Professional Soccer League and at least eight in the Major Indoor Soccer League.  He also played with the Trinidad and Tobago national team.

College
Chinapoo first attended college at Trinity College in Trinidad.  In 1978, he entered Long Island University in the United States.  In addition to his studies, he played on the men’s soccer team from 1978 to 1981, earning second team All-American recognition in 1978, 1979 and 1980. In 1981, he was selected as a first team All-American.  He finished his four seasons with the Blackbirds with fifty-five career goals and was inducted into the Long Island, University Athletic Hall of Fame in 2001.

Professional
On 16 March 1982 Chinapoo signed a one year contract with the New York Cosmos of the North American Soccer League.  He ultimately spent two seasons with New York.  Some sources show Chinapoo as playing for two Trinidad clubs, Malvern and San Juan Jabloteh, but the dates are unknown.  At some point, he joined the Baltimore Blast of Major Indoor Soccer League (MISL).  On 8 September 1988, Chinapoo signed as a free agent with the Dallas Sidekicks.  He spent two season with the Sidekicks before returning to Baltimore on 6 August 1990.  On 15 October 1991, Chinapoo signed as a free agent with the Sidekicks.  This time, he played only a year.  In 1992, MISL collapsed and several teams and most of the players jumped to the National Professional Soccer League (NPSL).  Chinapoo left Dallas and signed with the Harrisburg Heat of NPSL.  He would remain in Harrisburg for the remainder of his professional career, retiring from playing in 2000.  He was inducted into the Heat Hall of Fame on 3 November 2001.

National team
Chinapoo played numerous games with the Trinidad and Tobago national team, but the numbers and dates are unknown.  His name first appears on current records during a 17 August 1980 World Cup qualification victory over Haiti.  He played with the national team until at least 11 June 1989 when he played another World Cup qualification game, this time a 0–1 loss to Costa Rica.

Coach
In 1998, Chinapoo became a player-coach with the Harrisburg Heat.  After he retired from playing in 2001, Chinapoo become a full-time head coach.  In 2001, he was named the NPSL Coach of the Year.  On August 11, 2002, after posting a 10-34 record during the 2001-2002 season, the Heat management released Chinapoo.  He is currently the Technical Director of the Capital Area Soccer Association in Harrisburg, Pennsylvania.

In the summer of 2012, Richard was named the head coach of the new Professional Arena Soccer League team, the Harrisburg Heat. He retired from coaching and moved to Florida after the 2013–14 Harrisburg Heat season.

References

Richard Chinapoo, "I took pride in punishing a goalkeeper" https://www.hail-caribbean-sport.com/richard-chinapoo-trinidad-football

External links
 Dallas Sidekicks profile
 

1957 births
Living people
All-American men's college soccer players
Baltimore Blast (1980–1992) players
Dallas Sidekicks (original MISL) players
Expatriate soccer players in the United States
Harrisburg Heat players
LIU Sharks men's soccer players
Major Indoor Soccer League (1978–1992) players
National Professional Soccer League (1984–2001) coaches
National Professional Soccer League (1984–2001) players
New York Cosmos players
North American Soccer League (1968–1984) players
Professional Arena Soccer League coaches
San Juan Jabloteh F.C. players
Trinidad and Tobago football managers
Trinidad and Tobago footballers
Trinidad and Tobago expatriate footballers
Trinidad and Tobago international footballers
Trinidad and Tobago expatriate sportspeople in the United States
Association football defenders